The world cups are, depending on the sport, either the highest level international tournaments in a given sport, or the second level of competition after world championships.

List

Athletics (track and field)
 Athletics World Cup [Discontinued] 
IAAF Continental Cup [Now Defunct]

Baseball and softball
 Baseball World Cup 
 Women's Baseball World Cup
 World Baseball Classic
 World Cup of Softball

Basketball
 FIBA Basketball World Cup 
 FIBA Women's Basketball World Cup
 FIBA 3x3 World Cup
 Wheelchair Basketball World Championship

Combat sports
 Biathlon World Cup (skiing & shooting)
 Archery World Cup
 Boxing World Cup
 Fencing World Cup
 Roller Derby World Cup
 ISSF World Cup (shooting)
 World Cup Taekwondo Team Championships
 Wrestling World Cup

Professional wrestling
 Lucha Libre World Cup
 TNA World Cup
 World Cup of Wrestling
 WWE World Cup
 SmackDown World Cup

Cricket
 Cricket World Cup
 ICC Men's T20 World Cup
 ICC World Test Championship
 ICC Champions Trophy
 Under-19 Cricket World Cup
 Women's Cricket World Cup
 ICC Women's T20 World Cup
 ICC Women's Under-19 Cricket World Cup

Equestrian
 Dubai World Cup (horse racing)
 Pegasus World Cup (horse racing)
 Show Jumping World Cup (equestrian)

Football

American football 
 IFAF World Cup

Football
 FIFA World Cup
 FIFA U-20 World Cup
 FIFA U-17 World Cup 
 FIFA Club World Cup
 FIFA Confederations Cup
 FIFA Women's World Cup 
 FIFA U-20 Women's World Cup
 FIFA U-17 Women's World Cup
 FIFA Beach Soccer World Cup
 FIFA Futsal World Cup
 CONIFA World Football Cup (non-FIFA nations football)
 Viva World Cup (non-FIFA nations football, defunct)
 FIFI Wild Cup (non-FIFA nations football)

Australian rules football 
 Australian Football International Cup

Rugby league football 
 Rugby League World Cup
 Rugby League World Cup 9s
 Touch Football World Cup
 Women's Rugby League World Cup
 Wheelchair Rugby League World Cup

Rugby union football 
 Rugby World Cup
 Rugby World Cup Sevens
 Rugby World Cup (women's)

Golf 
 Women's World Cup of Golf
 World Cup (men's golf)

Gymnastics
 FIG World Cup
 Artistic Gymnastics World Cup
 Rhythmic Gymnastics World Cup

Hockey

Field hockey
 Men's FIH Hockey World Cup (sometimes called the Hockey World Championships), the men's field hockey World Cup
 Women's FIH Hockey World Cup, the women's field hockey World Cup
 Men's FIH Hockey Junior World Cup, the junior men's field hockey World Cup
 Women's FIH Hockey Junior World Cup, the junior women's field hockey World Cup
 FIH Hockey5s World Cup, men's 5-a-side including goalies

Ice hockey
 World Cup of Hockey, the ice hockey World Cup
 Junior Club World Cup, for junior ice hockey club teams

Bandy
 Bandy World Cup, for bandy (also known as Russian hockey)
 Bandy World Cup Women

Kabbadi 
 Kabaddi World Cup (Circle style)
 Kabaddi World Cup (Standard style)

Motorsports
 A1 Grand Prix, a series billed as the "World Cup of Motorsport"
 Speedway World Cup (motorcycle speedway)
 Speedway World Team Cup (motorcycle speedway)

Multi-discipline sports 
 ITU Triathlon World Cup (cycling, running, swimming)
 Biathlon World Cup (skiing, shooting)

Multi-sport events 
 Paralympic World Cup (multiple sports)
 Paralympic Winter World Cup (multiple sports)

Racquet sports 
 Table Tennis World Cup (men's singles, women's singles, men's team and women's team)

Badminton
 Sudirman Cup (mixed team)
 Thomas Cup (men's team)
 Uber Cup (women's team)
 Badminton World Cup (now defunct)

Tennis 
 Davis Cup (men's team)
 Fed Cup (women's team)
 Hopman Cup (mixed team)
 World Team Cup (men's team) – now defunct

Rollersports
 Men's Roller Derby World Cup
 Roll Ball World Cup
 Roller Derby World Cup
 World Inline Cup (inline speed skating)

Video games and  table 
 Electronic Sports World Cup
 Chess World Cup
 PDC World Cup of Darts
 World Cup of Poker
 World Cup of Pool

Volleyball 
 FIVB Volleyball Men's World Cup
 FIVB Volleyball Women's World Cup
 FIVB Volleyball World Grand Champions Cup (men's and women's)

Water sports
 Canoe World Cup
 Canoe Slalom World Cup
 Rowing World Cup
 FINA Diving World Cup
 FINA Swimming World Cup
 FINA Synchronized Swimming World Cup
 FINA Water Polo World Cup

Winter sports

Ski/snowboard 
 Biathlon World Cup
 FIS Alpine Ski World Cup
 FIS Cross-Country World Cup
 FIS Freestyle Skiing World Cup
 FIS Ski Cross World Cup
 FIS Nordic Combined World Cup
 FIS Ski Jumping World Cup
 FIS Snowboard World Cup
 FIS Ski Flying World Cup
 World Cup in Ski Orienteering

Sledding 
 Bobsleigh World Cup
 Luge World Cup
 Skeleton World Cup

Other winter sports
 Curling World Cup
 UIAA Ice Climbing World Cup
 Short Track Speed Skating World Cup
 Speed Skating World Cup

Other 
 Netball World Cup (women's)
 Orienteering World Cup
 PBR Global Cup (bull riding)
 PBR World Cup (bull riding, defunct)
 QubicaAMF Bowling World Cup
 UCI World Cup (various cycling world cups)
 Women's Lacrosse World Cup

See also
 List of world cups and world championships for juniors and youth
 List of world sports championships
 World championship
 World cup

world cups